The Special Narcotics Prosecutor for the City of New York is a city-wide position appointed by the five county district attorneys of New York City. The office is responsible for the prosecution of felony violations of narcotics laws within New York City. The current holder of the office is Bridget G. Brennan.

History
The Special Narcotics Prosecutor for the City of New York (SNP) is appointed by the five district attorneys of New York City (Bronx District Attorney, Brooklyn District Attorney, Queens District Attorney, Staten Island District Attorney, Manhattan District Attorney). The office was created by Attorney General of New York Louis J. Lefkowitz under the governorship of Nelson Rockefeller.

The position of the Special Narcotics Prosecutor for the City of New York is notable in several ways:
 It is a state level position, so it overrides the jurisdiction of the five county district attorneys who appoint the SNP, but its jurisdiction does not extend to the rest of the state.
 It is a permanent special prosecutor / special deputy attorney general position created via executive orders, not via legislative action.
 The office is staffed by assistant district attorneys assigned from each of the five borough district attorneys.

One of the better known cases associated with the Special Narcotics Prosecutor is that of Frank Lucas, which was fictionalized in the movie American Gangster.

List of office holders

Partner agencies
As a prosecuting attorney office, the Office of the Special Narcotics Prosecutor has its own Investigations Division, and works closely with federal, state, and local law enforcement agencies including:
 Drug Enforcement Administration
 U.S. Postal Service
 New York State Police
 New York Drug Enforcement Task Force
 Port Authority Police
 New York City Police Department's Organized Crime Control Bureau
 Homeland Security Investigations

See also
 Frank Lucas (drug dealer)
 American Gangster (film)
 Opioid epidemic
 Rockefeller Drug Laws

References

External links
 Official website of the Office of the Special Narcotics Prosecutor

1971 establishments in New York City
Controlled substances in New York (state)